The steamboat Oakes Ames was built in 1868 by the Napoleon B Proctor Shipyard in Burlington, Vermont for the Rutland Railroad. The 244-foot paddle wheeler was designed to ferry railroad cars from Burlington across Lake Champlain to Plattsburgh, New York. She was named after one of the railroad's directors' Oakes Ames. 

She successfully trialed on 19 August 1868 and her maiden excursion ran the next day to Willsboro Bay, Plattsburg. Mr. Ames went onward to Montreal for a review of the railroad's assets.

In 1874, the ship was renamed and repurposed for passenger service as the Champlain II. 
The following year, on July 16, 1875, the ship was wrecked when it ran aground after drifting off course while being guided by a pilot under the influence of morphine. A salvage operation shortly afterwards removed much of the superstructure, leaving about a third of the wreck in place. 

The site is now an archaeological site located in Lake Champlain near Westport in Essex County, New York. It was listed on the National Register of Historic Places in 1997.

References

Archaeological sites on the National Register of Historic Places in New York (state)
National Register of Historic Places in Essex County, New York
Shipwrecks of New York (state)
Essex County, New York
Shipwrecks in lakes
Paddle steamers of the United States
Maritime incidents in July 1875